Disulfuric acid (alternative spelling disulphuric acid) or pyrosulfuric acid (alternative spelling pyrosulphuric acid), also named oleum, is a sulfur oxoacid. It is a major constituent of fuming sulfuric acid, oleum, and this is how most chemists encounter it.  As confirmed by X-ray crystallography, the molecule consists of a pair of SO2(OH) groups joined by an oxide.

Reactions
It is also a minor constituent of liquid anhydrous sulfuric acid due to the equilibria:

H2SO4<=>H2O + SO3
SO3 + H2SO4<=> H2S2O7
2H2SO4 <=> H2O + H2S2O7[Global]

The acid is prepared by reacting excess sulfur trioxide (SO3) with sulfuric acid:H2SO4 + SO3 -> H2S2O7

Disulfuric acid can be seen as the sulfuric acid analog of an acid anhydride. The mutual electron-withdrawing effects of each sulfuric acid unit on its neighbour causes a marked increase in acidity. Disulfuric acid is strong enough to protonate "normal" sulfuric acid in the (anhydrous) sulfuric acid solvent system. There are salts of disulfuric acid, commonly called pyrosulfates, e.g. potassium pyrosulfate.

There are other related acids with the general formula H2O·(SO3)x though none can be isolated.

See also
 Pyrophosphoric acid
 Disulfurous acid
 Oleum
 Sulfuric acid
 Sulfur oxoacid
 Trithionic acid

References

Hydrogen compounds
Pyrosulfates
Sulfur oxoacids
Acid anhydrides